Gerhard Lauke (born 25 February 1952) is a German former cyclist. He competed for East Germany in the individual road race and team time trial events at the 1976 Summer Olympics.

References

External links
 

1952 births
Living people
East German male cyclists
Olympic cyclists of East Germany
Cyclists at the 1976 Summer Olympics
Cyclists from Brandenburg
People from Oder-Spree
People from Bezirk Frankfurt